Log is a settlement in the Municipality of Ruše in northeastern Slovenia. It lies in a valley of a small right tributary of the Drava River in the Pohorje Hills south of Bistrica ob Dravi. The area is part of the traditional region of Styria. The municipality is now included in the Drava Statistical Region.

References

External links
Log at Geopedia

Populated places in the Municipality of Ruše